Megisto is a genus of butterflies of the subfamily Satyrinae in the family Nymphalidae.

Species
Megisto cymela (Cramer, [1777]) – little wood satyr
Megisto cymela viola (Maynard, 1891) – Viola's wood satyr
Megisto rubricata (Edwards, 1871) – red satyr [US (New Mexico, Oklahoma), Mexico, Guatemala]

References

Euptychiina
Nymphalidae of South America